Ochamchire District of Georgia, now Ochamchire Municipality
 Ochamchira District of Abkhazia

District name disambiguation pages